Carla Valentina Guerrero Puelle (born 23 December 1987) is a Chilean footballer who plays as a defender for Club Universidad de Chile and the Chile women's national team.

She studied Physical Education at the Pontifical Catholic University of Valparaíso.

Honors

Individual
 IFFHS CONMEBOL Woman Team of the Decade 2011–2020

Career transfers and statistics 
The below list contains the football clubs and seasons in which Guerrero Puelle has played. It includes the total number of appearance (caps), substitution details, goals, yellow and red cards stats.

References

External links 

 

1987 births
Living people
Footballers from Santiago
Chilean women's footballers
Women's association football central defenders
Women's association football midfielders
Pontifical Catholic University of Valparaíso alumni
Universidad de Chile footballers
Everton de Viña del Mar footballers
Colo-Colo (women) footballers
Independiente Santa Fe (women) players
Primera División (women) players
Rayo Vallecano Femenino players
Chile women's international footballers
Competitors at the 2014 South American Games
South American Games silver medalists for Chile
South American Games medalists in football
Chilean expatriate women's footballers
Chilean expatriate sportspeople in Colombia
Chilean expatriate sportspeople in Spain
Expatriate women's footballers in Colombia
Expatriate women's footballers in Spain
2019 FIFA Women's World Cup players
Footballers at the 2020 Summer Olympics
Olympic footballers of Chile